John Lowey (born 6 August 1966 in Dundonald, Northern Ireland) is a former professional boxer. Lowey fought at super bantamweight and won the IBO world title in 1995. He represented Ireland at the 1988 Olympics in the bantamweight category. He defeated Mustafa Selah of Iraq and Mohamed Sabo of Nigeria in his first two bouts before being eliminated by Nyamaagiin Altankhuyag of Mongolia in the Round of 16.

1988 Olympic record
Below are the results of John Lowey, an Irish bantamweight boxer who competed at the 1988 Seoul Olympics:

 Round of 64: defeated Mustafa Saleh (Iraq) by decision, 5-0
 Round of 32: defeated Mohamed Sabo (Nigeria) by decision, 4-1
 Round of 16 lost to Nyamaagiin Altankhuyag (Mongolia) by decision, 2-3

References

External links
 

1966 births
Living people
People from Dundonald, County Down
Male boxers from Northern Ireland
Irish male boxers
Boxers at the 1988 Summer Olympics
Olympic boxers of Ireland
Super-bantamweight boxers